Sierra Madre Boulevard is a  long road connecting five suburbs of Pasadena, California; Arcadia, Sierra Madre, Hastings Ranch, East Pasadena, and San Marino.

For the most part, it is a winding road divided by a grassy median, but the part between Pasadena and Arcadia is a two-lane road.

It was built around the Pacific Electric Sierra Madre interurban railway line. The smaller and older portion of the road was originally Central Avenue in Sierra Madre, built some time in the 1860s or 1870s. The road forms a "┌" shape, starting at Elevado Avenue in Arcadia heading west and ends at Huntington Drive in San Marino. At Huntington Drive the road continues south as San Marino Ave, ending at Clary Ave, near S. Del Mar Ave.

The section of Sierra Madre Boulevard between Washington Boulevard and Sierra Madre Villa Avenue is the end of the Tournament of Roses Parade. Floats are display the day after the Roses Parade on Sierra Madre Boulevard. Much of the boulevard in Pasadena has large grass median strip area between the lanes, that was part of the Pacific Electric street car in the past.

Notable on the Boulevard
 Santa Anita Ave, Arcadia 
Sierra Madre Pioneer Cemetery
Baldwin Ave, Sierra Madre
Jailhouse Inn, Sierra Madre
Old North Church of Sierra Madre Congregational Church
Sierra Madre Memorial Park
Sierra Madre Police Department
Sierra Madre City Hall and Fire Department
Sierra Madre City Library
Michillinda Ave (Sierra Madre- Pasadena City line)
La Salle High School, Pasadena
Church of the Nazarene
 Field Elementary School, Pasadena
San Gabriel Valley Council, now part of the Greater Los Angeles Area Council, Pasadena
 New York Drive (north) - Sierra Madre Villa Ave (south)
Eaton Canyon Golf course, Pasadena
Washington Boulevard
Pasadena High School
Victory Park, Pasadena
Orange Grove Boulevard, Pasadena
Foothill Boulevard, Pasadena
Interstate 210, Pasadena - L Line Metro rail
Colorado Boulevard, Pasadena
E. Del Mar Blvd.  (Pasadena - San Marino City line)
E. California Blvd.
Huntington Drive, San Marino

References

Pacific Electric org  Central - Sierra Madre Boulevard
Pasadena Heritage Org Running with History - Mile 23: Sierra Madre Line
USC Digital Library, View of Pacific Electric car 401 at the intersection of Baldwin Avenue and Sierra Madre Boulevard in Sierra Madre, 1908
Pacific Electric Sierra Madre Line, by the Electric Railway Historic Association of Southern California.

Streets in the San Gabriel Valley
Streets in Los Angeles County, California
Streets in Pasadena, California
Arcadia, California
San Marino, California
Sierra Madre, California
Boulevards in the United States